The article describes the european pre-qualifiers for the 2023 FIBA Basketball World Cup qualification.

First round

Draw
The draw was held on 29 October 2019 and the seeding was based on the FIBA Men's World Ranking.

Due to the COVID-19 pandemic, each group played the November window at a single venue. The same was done for the February 2021 games.

All times are local.

Group A

Group B

Second round
The four qualified teams were joined by the eight teams that were eliminated from the EuroBasket 2022 qualifiers.

Draw
The draw was made on 28 April 2021. Teams that advanced from the previous round were assigned to Pot 3, while teams eliminated from EuroBasket 2022 qualifiers were assigned to Pots 1 or 2, according to FIBA rankings.

Austria withdrew before this round had commenced and was replaced by Luxembourg, as best ranked team from the previous round which did not advance, on 19 June 2021.

Due to the COVID-19 pandemic, each group played the August window at a single venue.

All times are local.

Group C

Group D

Group E

Group F

References

External links
Official website

qualification
Basketball competitions in Europe between national teams
2020–21 in European basketball
2021–22 in European basketball